German Township is one of the ten townships of Clark County, Ohio, United States.  The 2010 census reported 7,487 people living in the township, 7,112 of whom lived in the unincorporated portions of the township.

Geography
Located in the northern part of the county, it borders the following townships:
Mad River Township, Champaign County - north
Urbana Township, Champaign County - northeast corner
Moorefield Township - east
Springfield Township - southeast
Bethel Township - southwest
Pike Township - west
Jackson Township, Champaign County - northwest corner

Several communities are located in German Township:
Lawrenceville, an unincorporated community in the center of the township
Part of Springfield, the county seat of Clark County, in the southeast of the township
Tremont City, a village in the northeast of the township

Name and history
German Township was possibly named from the German pioneer settlers.

It is one of five German Townships statewide.

Government
The township is governed by a three-member board of trustees, who are elected in November of odd-numbered years to a four-year term beginning on the following January 1. Two are elected in the year after the presidential election and one is elected in the year before it. There is also an elected township fiscal officer, who serves a four-year term beginning on April 1 of the year after the election, which is held in November of the year before the presidential election. Vacancies in the fiscal officership or on the board of trustees are filled by the remaining trustees.

References

External links
County website

Townships in Clark County, Ohio
Townships in Ohio